The Kotsanas Museum of Ancient Greek Technology is situated in Katakolo, Elis, Greece. It has three permanent annexes (in Athens 6 Pindarou Str. and Akadimias), Ancient Olympia (9 Praxiteli Kondyli Str.) and at Katakolon port (paternal home of Giannis Latsis), and has travelling exhibitions.

Further reading
 Kotsanas, Kostas (2009) - Familiar and Unfamiliar Aspects of Ancient Greek Technology 
 Kotsanas, Kostas (2008) - Ancient Greek Technology
 Kotsanas, Kostas (2009) - The Musical Instruments of the Ancient Greeks

External links
Official site
www.cyprusevents.net
www.mlahanas.de
Swansea university
www.diakopes.gr (in Greek)

Technology
Ancient
Science museums in Greece
Buildings and structures in Elis
Ancient Greek technology
Museums of ancient Greece in Greece